Hugo Drechou (born 31 May, 1991) is a French cross-country mountain biker.

Major results

2009
 3rd  Team relay, UCI World Championships
2013
 2nd Overall UCI Under-23 XCO World Cup
1st Vallnord
 2nd National Under-23 XCO Championships
 3rd  European Under-23 XCO Championships
2014
 2nd National XCO Championships
2015
 2nd National XCM Championships
2019
 3rd National XCM Championships
2020
 1st  National XCM Championships

References

External links

French male cyclists
French mountain bikers
Living people
1991 births
Cyclists at the 2015 European Games
European Games competitors for France